Guji may refer to:

Guji Oromo, an Ethiopian ethnic group, a subgroup of the Oromo people
Guji Zone, in the Oromia Region, Ethiopia
Guji Lorenzana (born 1980), Filipino model, actor, and radio DJ
Gūji, a Japanese term for the chief priest of a Shinto shrine
Guji Guji, a picture book by Chih-Yuan Chen